The 1978–79 Coppa Italia, the 32nd Coppa Italia was an Italian Football Federation domestic cup competition won by Juventus.

Group stage

Group 1

Group 2

Group 3

Group 4

Group 5

Group 6

Group 7

Quarter-finals 
Join the defending champion: Internazionale.

p=after penalty shoot-out

Semi-finals

Final

Top goalscorers

References
rsssf.com

Coppa Italia seasons
Coppa Italia
Coppa Italia